

Professional teams

American 
 Allen Americans (ECHL) – Allen, Texas, USA
 Houston Texans (National Football League) – Houston, Texas, USA
 New York Knicks (NBA), the name "Knick" is a shortened version of the word "Knickerbocker", a term which comes from a pseudonym used by Washington Irving in his book, A History of New York.  The term was used to refer to the descendants of the original Dutch settlers of New York. Later, by extension, the term was used to describe New Yorkers in general.
 New York Yankees (Major League Baseball) – New York City, New York, USA
 Rochester Americans (American Hockey League) – Rochester, New York, USA
 Tri-City Americans (Western Hockey League) – Kennewick, Washington, USA

Bavarians 
 FC Bayern Munich (Association football) – Munich, Germany

Canadian

Canadians in general 
Vancouver Canucks (National Hockey League) – Vancouver, British Columbia

French Canadians 
 Les Canadiennes de Montréal (Canadian Women's Hockey League) – Montreal, Quebec, Canada
 Montreal Canadiens (National Hockey League) – Montreal, Quebec, Canada

Celtic/Irish 
 Boston Celtics (NBA) – Boston, Massachusetts, USA
 Celta de Vigo – Galician football team whose name reflects Celtic people.
 Celtic FC – Scottish football team whose name reflects Celtic people, both Scottish and Irish.
 Hibernian FC – Scottish football club reflecting Irish origins.
 London Irish (Premiership Rugby) – Brentford, Greater London, England

Cornish 
 London Cornish (Rugby Union) – London, England

Cossacks 
 Vinnytski Haidamaky (Ukrainian Hockey Championship) – Vinnytsia, Ukraine
 Kozakken Boys (Tweede Divisie) — Werkendam, Netherlands

Egyptian 
Al Masry SC – Port Said, Egypt
Egypt national football team The Pharaohs – Alexandria and Cairo, Egypt

Indian 
 Mumbai Indians, Cricket, (Indian Premier League) – Mumbai, Maharashtra, India

Indigenous peoples

Italian 
 Brooklyn Italians – U.S. Football (soccer) team based in Brooklyn, New York
 Audax Italiano – Chilean Football club based in La Florida

Maccabees

Poles 
 Polonia Warsaw – Polish Football (soccer) team, founded when Poland was not an independent country

Roslagen 
 Rospiggarna (Allsvenskan)

Saxons 
 The England Saxons, the country's second men's rugby union XV, formerly known as England A

Scots/Highlanders 
 Edmonton Scottish (AMSL) – Edmonton, Alberta, Canada
 Highlanders, a team based in Otago, New Zealand, named for the Scottish population of the area.
 London Scottish F.C. (RFU Championship) – Richmond, London, England
 Victoria Highlanders (USL League Two) – Victoria, British Columbia, Canada

Spaniards
 Deportivo Español, Parque Avellaneda, Argentina
 RCD Espanyol, Barcelona
 Real Club España, Mexico City
 San Diego Padres (MLB), San Diego, California, USA
 Unión Española, Independencia, Chile

Asturians
 Asturias F.C., Mexico City

Viking 
 Canberra Vikings (NRC) – Canberra, Australia
 Minnesota Vikings (NFL) – Minneapolis, Minnesota, USA
 Viking FK (Eliteserien) – Stavanger, Norway
 Víkingur (Úrvalsdeild) – Reykjavík, Iceland

School and youth teams

Arabs
 Coachella Valley High School, Coachella, California, USA. The nickname has been changed to "Mighty Arabs" and the cartoonish "Arab" mascot and logo have been retired.

Athenians
 Mount St. Mary's University, Los Angeles, California

Britons
 Albion College, Albion, Michigan

Cajuns
 University of Louisiana, Lafayette, Louisiana

Celtics
 Carlow University, Pittsburgh, Pennsylvania

Dutchmen
 Hope College, Holland, Michigan – Flying Dutchmen
 Union College, Schenectady, New York
 Edgerton High School, Edgerton, Minnesota – Flying Dutchmen

Gaels
 Bishop Gorman High School, Las Vegas
 Iona College, New Rochelle, New York 
 Queen's University, Kingston, Ontario  
 Saint Mary's College, Moraga, California

Irish
 University of Notre Dame, South Bend, Indiana

Indigenous peoples

Norse
 Luther College, Decorah, Iowa
 Northern Kentucky University, Highland Heights, Kentucky

Quakers
 University of Pennsylvania, Philadelphia, Pennsylvania

Samurai
 Sheridan Japanese School, Sheridan, Oregon

Saxons
 Alfred University, Village of Alfred, New York

Scots/Highlanders
 Alma College, Alma, Michigan – Scots
 Carlmont High School, Belmont, California – Scots
 College of Wooster, Wooster, Ohio – Fighting Scots
 Covenant College, Lookout Mountain, Georgia – Scots
 Edinboro University, Edinboro, Pennsylvania • Heathwood Hall Episcopal school, Columbia, South Carolina – highlanders
 Gordon College, Boston, Massachusetts – Fighting Scots
 Incline High School, Incline Village, Nevada - Highlanders
 Lyon College, Batesville, Arkansas – Scots
 Macalester College, Saint Paul, Minnesota – Fighting Scots
 McHenry County College, McHenry County, Illinois – Scots
 MacMurray College, Jacksonville, Illinois – mascot is the Highlander
 Maryville College, Maryville, Tennessee – Scots
 Monmouth College, Monmouth, Illinois – Fighting Scots
 New Jersey Institute of Technology, Newark, New Jersey 
 Ohio Valley University, Vienna, West Virginia – Fighting Scots
 Presbyterian College, Clinton, South Carolina – Nickname is Blue Hose, mascot is Scotty the Scotsman
 Radford University, Radford, Virginia 
 Shadle Park High School, Spokane, Washington – Highlanders (Based on the Henderson Clan)
 University of California, Riverside, California

Spartans

Swedes
 Bethany College, Lindsborg, Kansas – Terrible Swedes

Tartars
 El Camino College Compton Center, Compton, California
 Compton High School, Compton, California – In reference to the college, the high school is the "tarbabes".

Trojans

 University of Arkansas at Little Rock, Little Rock, Arkansas 
 Troy University, Troy, Alabama 
 University of Southern California, Los Angeles, California

Vandals
 University of Idaho, Moscow, Idaho

Vikings
 Augustana College, Rock Island, Illinois
 Augustana University, Sioux Falls, South Dakota 
 Bethany Lutheran College, Mankato, Minnesota
 Cleveland State University, Cleveland, Ohio 
 Downey High School, Downey, California
 Homewood-Flossmoor High School, Flossmoor, Illinois
 Lynbrook High School, San Jose, California
 Miamisburg High School, Miamisburg, Ohio
 Northern Kentucky University, Highland Heights, Kentucky – Nickname is Norse; mascot is Victor E. Viking.
 Portland State University, Portland, Oregon 
 Western Washington University, Bellingham, Washington

Defunct names 
 Atlanta Black Crackers – (Negro league baseball team)
 Cleveland Indians - (Major League Baseball team), Cleveland, Ohio, now the Guardians
 Cincinnati Cubans – (Negro league baseball team)
 Edmonton Eskimos – (Canadian Football League) – Edmonton, Alberta.  Name use discontinued in 2020. Team rebranded as Edmonton Elks in 2021 after interim period as "EE Football Team."
 Hermosillo Seris
 Hofstra Flying Dutchmen, now the "Pride"
 Nebraska Wesleyan Plainsmen, today the "Prairie Wolves"
 New York Americans – (National Hockey League, 1925–1941)
 New York Black Yankees – (Negro league baseball team)
 New York Cubans – (Negro league baseball team)
 Pekin High School (Pekin, Illinois) Chinks, now the "Dragons"
 Quebec Nordiques – (WHA 1972–1979, NHL 1979–1995)
 San Antonio Black Indians – (Negro league baseball team)
 Sonoma State University Cossacks, now the Seawolves
 Washington Redskins (National Football League) – Washington, D.C., USA, now the Commanders
 Wayne State Tartars, now the Warriors.

See also
 Mascot
 List of college sports team nicknames
 List of sports team names and symbols derived from Greek and Roman antiquity
 Indigenous peoples
 List of university and college nickname changes in the United States

References

Lists of sports teams
Sports mascots
Lists of names
Lists of mascots